Johann Michael Raich (Ottobeuren in Bavaria, 17 January 1832 – Mainz, 28 March 1907) was a Catholic theologian.

Biography 
Raich pursued his gymnasial studies under the Benedictines at St. Stephen's at Augsburg, and studied philosophy and theology at the [[Collus was at Rome during the Vatican Council. He was also a cathedral prebend from 4 May 1867. After the death of Bishop von Ketteler, during the years of the Kulturkampf, Raich had a position in the episcopal Chancery. On 29 November 1890, Bishop Paul Leopold Haffner appointed him cathedral canon, and on 11 April 1900, he became cathedral dean.

Published works 
Raich did much notable literary work. Among his writings are: "Die Auflehnung Döllingers gegen die Kirche u. ihre Autotät" (Mainz, 1871); "Ueber das Alter der Erstcommunicanten" (Mainz, 1875); "Shakespeare's Stellung zur katholischen Religion" (Mainz, 1884); "Die innere Unwahrheit der Freimaurerei" (first issued at Mainz, 1884, under the pseudonym of Otto Beuren; 2nd ed. under his own name Raich, 1897); "St. Augustinus u. der Mosaische Schöpfungsbericht" (Frankfort-on-Main, 1889).

Besides these original works he edited the following: Bruno Franz Leopold Liebermann's "Institutiones theologicæ" (10th ed., 2 vols., Mainz, 1870); "Joannis Maldonati Commentarii in quatuor Evangelistas" (new ed., 2 vols., Mainz, 1874); "Predigten des Bischofs von Ketteler" (2 vols., Mainz, 1878); "Briefe von u. an Wilhelm Emmanuel Freiherrn von Ketteler, Bischof von Mainz" (Mainz, 1879); "Hirtenbriefe von Wilhelm Emmanuel Freiherrn von Ketteler, Bischof von Mainz" (Mainz, 1904); "Novalis' Briefwechsel mit Schlegel" (Mainz, 1880); "Dorothes von Schlegel geb. Mendelssohn und deren Söhne Johannes und Phillip Viet, Briefwechsel" (w vols., Mainz, 1881); J. B. Rady's "Geschichte der katholischen Kirche in Hessen" (Mainz, 1904).

After the death of Johann Baptist Heinrich and Christoph Moufang, Raich was editor of "Der Katholik" from 1891 to 1907. From 1887 he also revised the "Frankfurter zeitgemässen Broschüren".

References 

1832 births
1907 deaths
19th-century German Catholic theologians
Clergy from Mainz
19th-century German male writers
Writers from Unterallgäu
German male non-fiction writers
19th-century German Roman Catholic priests